Ceremoni is the debut studio album by Danish hip hop recording artist Kriswontwo, released on 14 September 2015. ,

The album followed the critically acclaimed "Ms. One Ep" by Georgia Anne Muldrow, which Kriswontwo produced.

Track listing
All tracks produced by Kriswontwo.

 Woke (feat. Liv Lykke) – 3:27
 Elevations (feat. Georgia Anne Muldrow, Oh No & El Da Sensei) – 3:35
 Epiphany Of Emcees (feat. MED) – 3:00
 Focused (feat. Edgar Allen Floe & Nicholas Ryan Gant) – 2:46
 Lost Gates (feat. MED, AB & Nicholas Ryan Gant) – 3:46
 Get It Right (feat. Bobby Earth) – 3:40
 Run (feat. Billow) – 3:43 
 YCBS (feat. Amalia) – 3:08
 Love, Need You (feat. Omar) – 3:21 
 Achievements (feat. Skyzoo) – 3:15
 Life Force (feat. Stacy Epps) – 3:46
 Origin Of Eye (feat. Nanna.B) – 3:08

Credits

Performers
 Kriswontwo - all production
 Liv Lykke - vocals
 Georgia Anne Muldrow - vocals
 Oh No - rap
 El Da Sensei - rap
 MED - rap
 Edgar Allen Floe - rap
 Nicholas Ryan Gant - vocals, choir
 AB - vocals, backing vocals
 Bobby Earth - vocals
 Billow - vocals
 Amalia - vocals
 Omar - vocals
 Skyzoo - rap
 Stacy Epps - vocals
 Nanna.B - vocals
 Alexander Kraglund - violin
 Buscrates - co-production (Lost Gates)
 Kay Young - backing vocals
 Peter Marott - trumpet
 Mads Mathias - saxophone
 MonoNeon - bas
 Carl Mörner - guitar
 Rasheeda Ali - flute
 Thor Madsen - guitar
 Boe Larsen - mastering
 Tokio Aoyama - artwork painting
 Juse One - graphics

Recording
Recorded at Mill Factory, Studio C, Copenhagen
All songs mixed by Kriswontwo at Mill Factory, Studio C, Copenhagen
Mastered by Boe Larsen, at Mill Factory, Studio C, Copenhagen
Executive producer: Dudley Perkins
Co-executive producer: Georgia Anne Muldrow

References

2015 debut albums
Kriswontwo albums